Spanish Rice is an album by American jazz trumpeter Clark Terry and Cuban composer-arranger Chico O'Farrill featuring performances recorded in 1966 for the Impulse! label.

Reception
The Allmusic review by Ken Dryden awarded the album 3 stars stating "This is a fun recording that had the potential to be a memorable one, but it falls a bit short".

Track listing
 "The Peanut Vendor" (Moises Simons) - 2:18 
 "Angelitos Negros" (Andres Eloy Blanco, Manuel Alvarez Maciste) - 2:41 
 "El Cumbanchero" (Rafael Hernández Marín) - 2:12 
 "Jooni" (Clark Terry) - 3:37 
 "Que Sera" (Tito Puente) - 2:45 
 "Mexican Hat Dance (Traditional) - 2:42 
 "Spanish Rice" (Chico O'Farrill, Clark Terry) - 2:47 
 "Say "Si Si"" (Ernesto Lecuona, Francia Luban, Al Stillman) - 2:30 
 "Macarena (La Virgen de la Macarena)" (Bernardo Bautista Monterde) - 3:02 
 "Tin Tin Deo" (Gil Fuller, Chano Pozo) - 2:46 
 "Contigo en la Distancia" (César Portillo de la Luz) - 3:02 
 "Happiness Is" (Paul Evans, Paul Parnes) - 3:21
Recorded in New York City on July 18, 1966 (tracks 2, 6, 8 & 10), July 19, 1966 (tracks 3, 5, 9 & 11) and July 20, 1966 (tracks 1, 4, 7 & 12)

Personnel
Clark Terry - trumpet, flugelhorn
Chico O'Farrill - arranger, conductor
Joe Newman, Ernie Royal, Snooky Young - trumpet, flugelhorn
Everett Barksdale, Barry Galbraith - guitar
George Duvivier - bass
Julio Cruz, Frank Malabe - percussion

References

Impulse! Records albums
Clark Terry albums
Chico O'Farrill albums
1966 albums
Albums produced by Bob Thiele
Albums conducted by Chico O'Farrill
Albums arranged by Chico O'Farrill